= Till-Preis =

German theater award

Till-Preis is a theatre festival in Germany.
